In Canada the Institutes of Health Research effected a policy of open access in 2008, which in 2015 expanded to include the Natural Sciences and Engineering Research Council and Social Sciences and Humanities Research Council. The Public Knowledge Project began in 1998 at University of British Columbia. Notable Canadian advocates for open access include Leslie Chan, Jean-Claude Guédon, Stevan Harnad, Heather Morrison, and John Willinsky.

Journals

 Les Presses de l'Université de Montréal issued one of the world's first open access journals, Surfaces in 1991.
 FACETS is Canada's first and only multidisciplinary open access journal in Canada.
 Anthropocene Coasts, is a multidisciplinary international open access journal jointly published by Canadian Science Publishing and East China Normal University.
 Arctic Science is a quarterly open-access peer-reviewed journal.

Repositories
There are some 88 collections of scholarship in Canada housed in digital open access repositories.

Timeline

Key events in the development of open access in Canada include the following:
 1998
 French-language Érudit online publishing platform launched.
 2006
 November: Athabasca University begins policy encouraging deposits in its institutional repository.
 2009
 October: York University begins open access policy.
 2017
 Coalition Publica founded to support publishing in social sciences and humanities fields.

See also
Open data in Canada
Open educational resources in Canada
Science and technology in Canada
 Open access in other countries

References

Further reading

External links

 

Academia in Canada
Communications in Canada
Canada
Publishing in Canada
Science and technology in Canada